Eda Station (江田駅) is the name of two train stations in Japan:

 Eda Station (Fukushima) in Fukushima
 Eda Station (Kanagawa) in Kanagawa